Bluff Swamp  is located in northwest Ascension Parish, Louisiana. The potential site covers 2,208 acres (8.9 km2). About 1,240 acres (5.0 km2) of the Bluff Swamp area make up the Bluff Swamp Wildlife Refuge.

Swamps of Louisiana
Landforms of Ascension Parish, Louisiana